Cold Around the Heart is a 1997 American crime film written and directed by John Ridley. The film stars David Caruso, Kelly Lynch, Stacey Dash, Chris Noth, John Spencer and Pruitt Taylor Vince. The film was released on November 7, 1997, by 20th Century Fox.

Plot
Two criminals who are also lovers, Ned and Jude, kill three people in a jewelry store robbery.  Ned is caught but escapes and vows revenge on Jude, who pushed him out of the getaway car.  Ned is joined in his hunt for Jude by a woman hitchhiker named Bec.

Cast    
 David Caruso as Ned Tash
 Kelly Lynch as Jude Law
 Stacey Dash as Bec Rosenberg
 Chris Noth as "T"
 John Spencer as Uncle Mike
 Pruitt Taylor Vince as Johnny "Cokebottles" Costello
 Richard Kind as Attorney Nabbish
 Kirk Baltz as Detective Logan
 Jennifer Jostyn as Inez, The Waitress
 Tom McGowan as Gun Store Clerk
 Mark Boone Junior as Angry Man
 Jack Orend as Motel Clerk
 Tracey Ross as Nurse Woman
 Gareth Williams as Car Dealer
 Richmond Arquette as Gas Station Man
 Jack Wallace as Police Captain
 Viggis Knittridge as himself

References

External links
 
 

1997 films
American crime films
1997 crime films
20th Century Fox films
Films directed by John Ridley
Films with screenplays by John Ridley
Films scored by Mason Daring
1990s English-language films
1990s American films
1997 directorial debut films